Sangram  Chougule  (born 28 December 1979) is an Indian bodybuilder from Kolhapur, currently settled in Pune. He won the title of Mr. Universe 2012 in the 85 kg category. Sangram won the Mr. India title six times and Mr. Maharashtra five times. He is an Electrical Engineer by education.

Film career
In 2019, he appeared in a Marathi language movie 'Dandam'.

References

External links

Official website
Best Indian Bodybuilder

Indian bodybuilders
Sportspeople from Pune
1979 births
Living people